Donald Klein may refer to:
Donald F. Klein (1928–2019), American psychiatrist
Donald L. Klein (born 1930), American inventor